Uwe Mares (born 8 May 1942 in Hamburg) is a German sailor. He finished fourth at the 1976 Summer Olympics in the Tempest class with Wolf Stadler.

References
 Profile at sports-reference.com

External links
 

1942 births
Living people
Sportspeople from Hamburg
German male sailors (sport)
Sailors at the 1976 Summer Olympics – Tempest
Olympic sailors of West Germany
20th-century German people